The Tajik Ground Forces, known officially as the Ground Forces of the Ministry of Defense of Tajikistan is the land army of the Armed Forces of the Republic of Tajikistan. Created during the Tajik civil war, it makes up about 70 percent of the country's Armed Forces.

History

Tajikistan is the only former Soviet republic that did not form its armed forces from old Soviet Army units. Instead, the Russian Defense Ministry took direct command of the Soviet units there, forcing the Tajik government to raise an army from scratch. The government began assembling the armed forces in February 1993. That summer, on 23 June, the ground forces were officially created.

It was originally established by the Ministry of Defense as the Armed Forces Department, and its first units were formed early in the year from skilled teams loyal to the Popular Front of Tajikistan. The personnel of the entire army saw the deployment of the following military units of that time: 13483, 07017, and 23441. By the mid 1990s, the ground forces numbered to around 3,000, with the majority of the officer corps being Russian, mostly veterans of the war in Afghanistan.

As of 1997, the ground forces had two motorized rifle brigades (one of them is a training brigade), a special operations brigade and detachment, as well as units and sub units that provide operational, technical and logistic support. The army benefited from several United Tajik Opposition units that were experienced from fighting government forces during the civil war, but as of 2006, were poorly maintained and funded. At that time the army had 44 main battle tanks, 34 armored infantry fighting vehicles, 29 armored personnel carriers, 12 pieces of towed artillery, 10 multiple rocket launchers, 9 mortars, and 20 surface-to-air missiles. The ground forces in 2007 had two motorized rifle brigades, one mountain brigade, one artillery brigade, one airborne assault brigade, one airborne assault detachment, and one surface-to-air missile regiment.

In the wake of the withdrawal of United States troops from Afghanistan, 20,000 reserve servicemen of the Ground Forces were sent to the border between Tajikistan and Afghanistan.

On October 28, 2021, China announced that it will finance the construction of a new base for Tajik commandos with another base near the Wakhan Corridor for Chinese troops.

Training 
It is frequently trained by personnel from Russia, China, France, India, and the United States. American trainers have worked on setting up a non-commissioned officer corps within the army to train enlisted personnel. Currently, more than 500 of servicemen are trained in Russia, and up to 1,000 junior specialists are trained annually at the Russian 201st Military Base.

Commanders 

 Emomali Sobirzoda (2010-2015)
Colonel Nazar Safarov (circa 2015)
 Bobojon Saidzoda (24 November 2015 - 9 February 2018)
Bakhtiyor Mumin Muminzoda (4 November 2018)

Structure
The Ground forces make up 70 percent of the Tajik National Army. It consists mainly of infantry, tank and artillery units. Many units are former militias, including several that fought the government during the Tajik civil war as part of the United Tajik Opposition. The following units are part of the Ground Forces:

 1st Motorized Rifle Brigade (Bokhtar)
 3rd Motorized Rifle Brigade (Khujand)
 12th Artillery Brigade (Dushanbe)
 183rd Separate Reconnaissance Battalion (Dushanbe)
 17th Separate Reactive Battalion (Khujand)
 75th Separate Medical Battalion
 74th Separate Company for Chemical and Biological Protection
 38th Separate Company of Electronic Warfare
7th Separate Rifle Battalion
Military Unit 15426 (Murghob District, Gorno-Badakhshan Autonomous Region)
Military Unit 08010 (Dushanbe), it serves as a training center for the training of specialists in armored vehicles BMP and BTR, T-72 tanks, anti-aircraft platoon, communicators and cooks. In this military unit, more than 60 percent of soldiers are from Sughd region.

7th Separate Rifle Battalion 
Unit 13483 was one of the first military units to be established, forming in October 1993 and being renamed to the 7th Separate Rifle Battalion, or Unit 08014. It is located on the Tajik-Afghan border, and performs its duties in conjunction with the Tajik Border Troops. On 13 August 1997, by the order of the Minister of Defense, Lieutenant Colonel Sherali Mirzo was appointed its commander. Currently, the commander of the military unit is Colonel Abdulhamid Safarzoda. It has been awarded the "Traveling Flag" and the "Mobile Flag". The unit is based in the Vose' District.

Equipment

References

Military of Tajikistan
Military units and formations of Tajikistan
1993 establishments in Tajikistan
Military units and formations established in 1993